The Saikot–Joshimath Badrinath Railway, notified as the project of national strategic importance, is Indian Railways's one of the four constituent routes of the proposed Char Dham Railway connecting the holiest Chota Char Dham of Hinduism. This 75 km route starts at Saikot and ends at Joshimath 46 km before Badrinath.

Railway routes
The 75 km route starts from a "Y" fork at Saikot off Karnaprayag–Saikot–Sonprayag Kedarnath Railway, and ends at Joshimath where people can ride or trek further 46 km to Badrinath.

Rishikesh–Karnaprayag Railway is also an under construction, new railway link extension from the Yog Nagri Rishikesh railway station to Karnaprayag.

Current status
Char Dham Railway project's 327 km long construction, costing INR ₹43,292 crore (USD $6.6 billion), began with the foundation stone laying and commencement of INR ₹120 crore Final Location Survey (FSL) in May 2017 by the Union Railway minister Suresh Prabhu.

See also

 Doiwala–Dehradun–Uttarkashi–Maneri Gangotri Railway
 Uttarkashi–Palar Yamunotri Railway
 Karnaprayag–Saikot–Sonprayag Kedarnath Railway
 Rishikesh–Karnaprayag Railway
 Diamond Quadrilateral railway project
 Golden Quadrilateral road project
 Setu Bharatam railway crossing-free flyover and underpass project

References

Rail transport in Uttarakhand

Proposed railway lines in India